"Tchiki boum" is a song by the French band Niagara. Originally issued as their debut single in 1985, it was included on their debut album Encore un dernier baiser (released in the autumn of 1986).

With this song, the band found immediate success.

It was the only single released by Niagara as a trio, as guitarist José Tamarin left after its release and the band has remained a duo from then on.

Writing and composition 
The song was written by Muriel Laporte.

Track listings 
7" single Polydor 883 329-7 (1985)
 "Tchiki boum" (3:30)
 "Torpedo" (3:20)

Charts

References 

1986 songs
1986 singles
Niagara (band) songs
Polydor Records singles